Shurka (also Romanized as Shūrkā) is a village in Siyahrud Rural District, in the Central District of Juybar County, Mazandaran Province, Iran. At the 2006 census, its population was 2,140, in 568 families.

References 

Populated places in Juybar County